Nothing to Report is an American comedy web series starring Chris Jericho and Nick Mundy as detectives Chance Blackstreet and Moses Packard, respectively. The first season, consisting of six episodes, premiered on April 13, 2015 on Comedy Central.com.

Cast

Main
 Nick Mundy as Moses Packard, Chance's overweight, lazy, and also emotionally troubled partner (6 episodes)
 Chris Jericho as Chance Blackstreet, a divorced, depressed, emotionally unstable detective (6 episodes)

Supporting
 Michael Ryan Truly as Hawk, a fellow detective and Broadway's partner (2 episodes)
 Echo Kellum as Broadway, a fellow detective and Hawk's partner (1 episode)

Guest
 Brian Stack as Captain Ed. U. Cation, an educational children's show star (1 episode)
 Brendon Walsh as Meth Head (1 episode)
 Jordan Black as Suspicious Man (1 episode)
 Andrée Vermeulen as Wife (1 episode)
 Damian Washington as Neighborhood Watch 1 (1 episode)
 David Harris as Neighborhood Watch 2 (1 episode)

Crew
The series is directed by Clint Gage and written by Gage, Mundy, and Michael Ryan Truly, who also serves as executive producer. Megan Rugh serves as producer, while the music is done by Barry J. Neely, the cinematography by Will Carnahan, the editing by Brad Conlin, and the art direction by Melissa Lyon.

Episodes
Season One (2015)
 1. Moses is Fat
 2. Captain Ed
 3. Emotional Scars
 4. Racism
 5. Partners
 6. Shootout

Production
On June 9, 2014, it was announced that Comedy Central had given a series order for the show, then titled Team Tiger Awesome. On April 9, 2015, Jericho announced via Instagram that the series would premiere on April 13, 2015.

See also
 No Activity, an Australian TV series with a similar premise
 No Activity, the US adaptation of the Australian show

References

External links
 

2010s American sitcoms
Comedy Central original programming
American comedy web series